Charles Bargue (c. 1826/1827 – April 6, 1883) was a French painter and lithographer noted for devising an influential drawing course.

Life and career

He is mostly remembered for his Cours de dessin, one of the most influential classical drawing courses conceived in collaboration with Jean-Léon Gérôme. The course, published between 1866 and 1871 by Goupil & Cie, comprised 197 lithographs printed as individual sheets, was to guide students from plaster casts to the study of great master drawings and finally to drawing from the living model. The Charles Bargue Drawing Course is used by many academies and ateliers which focus on Classical Realism. Among the artists whose work is based on the study of Bargue's plate work are Pablo Picasso and Vincent van Gogh, who copied the complete set in 1880/1881, and (at least a part of it) again in 1890.

Bargue was a student of Jean-Léon Gérôme.  Bargue worked closely with Gérôme and was influenced by his style, which included Orientalist scenes and historical genre.  Bargue's last painting was completed by Gérôme and is now conserved in the Malden Public Library, Malden, Massachusetts, USA. He travelled extensively through North Africa, and the Balkans, during which time he executed many portraits of local people with meticulous detail.

Charles Bargue Drawing Course 

This extraordinary drawing course has been resurrected in a lithography studio. The plates are available again from the original drawing course as they were proposed to academies in 1875. This set of exceptional lithographs is adopted by international academies of classical art, it will remain the definitive reference for the highest level of teaching.

Work

Publication
 Charles Bargue with the collaboration of Jean-Léon Gérôme, Charles Bargue Drawing Course,  1866

Paintings

See also
 List of Orientalist artists
 Orientalism

References

 Ackerman, Gerald M., (ed.) & Parrish, Graydon: Charles Bargue avec le concours de Jean-Léon Gérôme: Cours de dessin, French edition, 2003.

External links

 Artencyclopedia.com page on Bargue
 The art of drawing: Dahesh Museum of Art :  exhibition

 Goupil Museum 
 Charles Bargue Drawing Course 
 Reproduction of plates from the Charles Bargue Drawing Course https://fineartlithography.com/en/ 

1820s births
1883 deaths
19th-century French painters
Art educators
Academic art
French lithographers
French male painters
Orientalism
Orientalist painters
19th-century male artists